Oh Those Glorious Old Student Days is a 1930 German comedy film directed by Rolf Randolf and starring Werner Fuetterer, Fritz Alberti and Betty Amann. It is one of a number of films in the nostalgic Old Heidelberg tradition.

The film's sets were designed by the art director Erich Zander. It was shot on location in Heidelberg in the Rhineland.

Cast
 Werner Fuetterer as Student Robert Riedel
 Fritz Alberti as Herr Schwab
 Betty Amann as Norma, dessen Tochter
 Erwin van Roy as Balther
 Alfred Beierle as Methusalem
 Betty Astor as Mieze
 Anna Müller-Lincke as Frau Laubinger, die Wirtin
 Gretl Theimer

References

Bibliography

External links 
 

1930 films
1930 comedy films
Films of the Weimar Republic
German comedy films
1930s German-language films
Films directed by Rolf Randolf
Films set in Heidelberg
German black-and-white films
1930s German films